Raymond Thomas "Moose" Bellingham (October 29, 1916 – December 21, 1998) was an American professional basketball player. He played for the Youngstown Bears in the National Basketball League for one game during the 1945–46 season and scored one point. He also played in numerous independent leagues.

References

1916 births
1998 deaths
American men's basketball players
Basketball players from Pennsylvania
Centers (basketball)
Westminster Titans men's basketball players
Youngstown Bears players